In mathematics, Shafarevich's theorem states that any finite solvable group is the Galois group of some finite extension of the rational numbers.

References

 

Galois theory
Solvable groups